A kosher airline meal is an airline meal that conforms to the standards of kashrut. Many airlines offer the option of kosher meals to passengers if ordered in advance. These not only contain food that is kosher, but also other features to aid observant Jews, such as copies of Tefilat HaDerech (the Traveler's Prayer) and prayers that are recited before and after eating and bread on which the mezonot blessing is recited, thereby enabling observant Jews to consume the bread without washing hands.

"Kosher" is one of several options for special meals offered to air travelers. Similarly styled meals that are packaged in double wrapping with verifiable kashrut certification are offered in a variety of other settings, such as cruise ships, hospitals, or  catered events. The double wrapping allows for the meals to be heated in a non-kosher oven.

On airlines, kosher meals are the most commonly requested special meal. Kosher meals have become popular even among non-Jewish passengers who perceive kosher foods to be cleaner and healthier. As they cost approximately twice as much as standard meals, airlines may charge more for them.

History

Kosher airline meals started appearing as an option in the 1960s for Orthodox Jewish travelers.

Issues

Cost

Kosher meals cost the airline nearly twice as much as standard meals, even as they are offered at no additional cost to the traveler. Smithsonian Magazine has reported that kosher airline meals are the most expensive type of airline meal served.

Kashrut issues
Sometimes, dairy and meat foods are mixed by airline employees unaware of the kashrut guideline prohibiting such mixtures, or dairy is served too soon after a meat meal.

On Passover, meals containing chametz (bread which has leavened beyond 18 minutes) are sometimes served by mistake.

See also

Kosher certification agency
Kosher foods
Kosher restaurant

References

External links

EL AL Israel Airlines: Food and Beverages on EL AL Destinations
OUKosher.org: Flying the Kosher Skies

Kosher food
Airline catering